HVK Gusar Split is a rowing club from the city of Split, Croatia. Gusar is Croatian for "pirate". The club is the most successful rowing club in Dalmatia, and arguably in the whole of Croatia. It has a long tradition of success, members of the rowing club VK Gusar won numerous Olympic and World Championship medals.

History 

The Club was founded in 1914. The first Gusar "Rowing Home" was near Split's City Port, under the slopes of the Katalinića brig. Later, Gusar moved to a new Home, in the part of the city called Matejuška (in the City Port itself). Several years later, an auxiliary one was made in the city quarter Spinut.

In 1974, the facility in Matejuška was sold, and the Club moved to the Home in Spinut.

Honours

Olympics medallists

World Championships medallists

European Championships medallists

See also
Bogumir Doležal (co-founder of the club)
HNK Hajduk Split
RNK Split

References

External links
Official website  

Sports clubs established in 1914
Sport in Split, Croatia
Rowing clubs in Croatia